Gu Mei (1619–1664), better known by her art name Gu Hengbo, also known as Xu Mei and Xu Zhizhu after her marriage, was a Chinese courtesan, poet and painter. She received the title "Lady (furen)" from the early Qing court, and often addressed as "Lady Hengbo" in Qing writings.

Gu was famous for her beauty and talent within painting and poetry and counted among the elite of courtesans alongside Dong Xiaowan, Bian Yujing and Liu Rushi. She was admired for her paintings of orchids, and published a collection of poems which was given good critics, although few of her works have survived.

Life
Gu Mei was born near Nanjing in 1619. At the beginning of the Chongzhen reign, Gu Mei became a courtesan in the Qinhuai River district of Nanjing. In her Tower Meilou in Qinhuai district in Nanjing, she hosted a famous literary salon, which counted Chen Liang, Qian Lucan and Mao Xiang among its guests. Yu Huai described Meilou (literally house of bewitchment) as lavish and extravagant.

Gu Mei also acted in kunqu as a male (sheng) impersonator. One of her roles was Zhou Yu in Disciplining the Son. The writer Yu Huai recounted how after he had helped her when she ran afoul of the law, she offered to perform a stage drama for him on his birthday.

She fell in love with one of her patrons, Liu Fang (劉芳), promised to marry him and to end her career as a courtesan. When she later changed her mind, Liu Fang committed suicide.

One of her patrons, the career official Gong Dingzi, paid 1,000 ounces of silver for her services. In 1643, she left her profession to become a concubine to Gong Dingzi and settled with him in the capital. His openly demonstrated love for her attracted much attention during their time, as it offended the norms of Confucian ideals, and her influence over him became legendary. She is known to have saved the Yan Ermei from execution, and to have been the benefactor of the artist Zhu Yizun.

In 1659 Gu Mei gave birth to a daughter. Anxious to have a son, Gong Dingzi built a private Buddhist temple where the couple could pray for a son.

She was one of the Eight Beauties of Qinhuai described by late Qing officials. The other famed courtesans of this group are Ma Xianglan, Bian Yujing, Li Xiangjun, Dong Xiaowan, Liu Rushi, Kou Baimen, and Chen Yuanyuan.

References

Bibliography
 
 
 
 
 
 Zhang, Hongsheng [張宏生] (2002). "Gong Dingzi and the Courtesan Gu Mei:  Their Romance and the Revival of the Song Lyric in the Ming-Qing Transition", in Hsiang Lectures on Chinese Poetry, Volume 2, Grace S. Fong, editor. (Montreal: Center for East Asian Research, McGill University).

1619 births
1664 deaths
17th-century Chinese painters
17th-century Chinese poets
Ming dynasty painters
Chinese women painters
Chinese women poets
Qing dynasty painters
Ming dynasty poets
Qing dynasty poets
Painters from Nanjing
Poets from Jiangsu
Writers from Nanjing
17th-century Chinese women writers
Eight Beauties of Qinhuai
Chinese concubines
17th-century Chinese actresses
17th-century Chinese women singers
Ming dynasty actors
Male impersonators in Chinese opera
Actresses from Nanjing
Singers from Nanjing
Kunqu actresses